The Seobu Line is a future subway line scheduled to open in 2026, in Seoul, South Korea. Construction is scheduled to begin in 2021.

Stations 
The names of the stations are not yet final.

Extension

References 

Seoul Metropolitan Subway lines